Runar Holmberg (25 April 1923 – 27 December 1993) was a Finnish sprinter. He competed in the men's 400 metres at the 1948 Summer Olympics.

References

1923 births
1993 deaths
Athletes (track and field) at the 1948 Summer Olympics
Finnish male sprinters
Olympic athletes of Finland
Place of birth missing